Nana Akua Owusu Afriyie (born 3 September 1969) is a Ghanaian politician and a member of the New Patriotic Party. She was the Member of Parliament for Ablekuma North constituency.

Early life and education
Owusu Afriyie was born on 3 September 1969 in Saltpond, Central Region. She holds a diploma in Management Studies from the University of Cape Coast.

Politics 
In 2015, she contested and won the NPP parliamentary seat for the Ablekuma North Constituency in the Greater Accra Region. She won this parliamentary seat during the 2016 Ghanaian general elections. Three other candidates, namely Sally Amaki Darko of the National Democratic Congress, and Akwasi Asiama Adade of the Conventions People's Party also contested in the  2016 by-election of Ablekuma North held on 7 December 2016. Owusu Afriyie won the election by obtaining 54,698 votes out of the 82,091 cast, representing 66.84 percent of total valid votes.

Personal life
Owusu Afriyie is a married woman with four children. She identifies as a Christian.

References

Living people
21st-century Ghanaian women politicians
1969 births
People from Central Region (Ghana)
University of Cape Coast alumni
Ghanaian MPs 2017–2021
Accra Girls Senior High School alumni